Miss South Africa 2012 was held on 9 December 2012 in Sun City, South Africa. The winner will represent South Africa at Miss Universe 2013 and Miss World 2013. 12 contestants competed for the crown. Melinda Bam crowned Miss South Africa 2012, Marilyn Ramos from Pretoria.

Results 
Color keys

Finalists 
12 finalists competed for the title of Miss South Africa 2012:

References

External links

2012
2012 beauty pageants
2012 in South Africa
December 2012 events in South Africa